Thermokinetics deals with the study of thermal decomposition kinetics.

See also
Thermogravimetry
Differential thermal analysis
Differential scanning calorimetry

References

Chemical kinetics